Gurkha Peak is a peak rising to about  between Crescent Glacier and Von Guerard Glacier on the north slope of the Kukri Hills, Victoria Land, Antarctica. It was named by the New Zealand Geographic Board in 1998, in association with the Kukri Hills and the Gurkha people, traditional users of the kukri (knife).

References

Mountains of Victoria Land
McMurdo Dry Valleys